Sehy Ferenc (1764-1799), was a Hungarian stage actor. He belonged to the pioneer generation of professional actors of his country as a member of the first Hungarian theater company founded by Kelemen László, and played the male main part of several successful productions.

References 

 Pintér Jenő. A magyar irodalom története: tudományos rendszerezés, 4. kötet. (A drámairodalom a XVIII. század második felében c. fejezet) (1930–1941)

1764 births
1799 deaths
18th-century Hungarian actors